Azadliq a daily political newspaper, is one of the most popular newspapers in Azerbaijan.

References

External links

 

Newspapers published in Azerbaijan
Newspapers published in the Soviet Union
Azerbaijani-language newspapers
Free Media Awards winners